The IHL Man of the Year was awarded annually by the International Hockey League to the player who displays the most charitable and educational leadership in the community. The award was awarded from 1993 to 2001, also known as the I. John Snider, II Trophy.

Winners

References
IHL Man of the Year www.hockeydb.com

International Hockey League (1945–2001) trophies